The 2012 Coke Zero 400 was a NASCAR Sprint Cup Series stock car race held on July 7, 2012 at Daytona International Speedway in Daytona Beach, Florida. Contested over 160 laps, it was the eighteenth race of the 2012 NASCAR Sprint Cup Series season. Tony Stewart of Stewart-Haas Racing took his third win of the season, while Jeff Burton finished second and Matt Kenseth finished third.

This was the last race of Bill Elliott's 36-year career.

Report

Background

Daytona International Speedway is one of  six  superspeedways to hold NASCAR races, the others being Michigan International Speedway, Auto Club Speedway, Indianapolis Motor Speedway, Pocono Raceway and Talladega Superspeedway. The track's turns are banked at 31 degrees, while the front stretch, the location of the finish line, is banked at 18 degrees. David Ragan is the defending race winner.

Before the race, Matt Kenseth led the Drivers' Championship with 633 points, and Dale Earnhardt Jr. stood in second with 622. Jimmie Johnson was third in the Drivers' Championship with 610, two points ahead of Greg Biffle and thirty-four ahead of Denny Hamlin in fourth and fifth. Kevin Harvick, with 565, was eight points ahead of Clint Bowyer, as Martin Truex Jr. with 556 points, was eleven ahead of Tony Stewart and nineteen in front of Brad Keselowski. In the Manufacturers' Championship, Chevrolet was leading with 117 points, seventeen points ahead of Toyota. Ford, with 84 points, was eleven points ahead of Dodge in the battle for third.

Practice and qualifying

Two practice sessions were also held before the race on July 5, 2012. The first session was 80 minutes long, while the second was 85 minutes. Aric Almirola was quickest with a time of 44.563 seconds in the first session, 0.130 faster than Marcos Ambrose. Joey Logano was third quickest, followed by Ryan Newman, Biffle, and Jeff Gordon. A. J. Allmendinger was seventh, still within half of a second of Almirola's time. In the second and final practice session, Jamie McMurray was quickest with a time of 45.492 seconds. Michael Waltrip, with a time of 45.516, was second quickest, ahead of Kurt Busch, Travis Kvapil, and Almirola. Regan Smith, Ambrose, Carl Edwards, Earnhardt Jr., and Juan Pablo Montoya completed the first ten positions.

Forty-four cars were entered for qualifying, but only forty-three could qualify for the race because of NASCAR's qualifying procedure. Kenseth clinched the eighth pole position of his career, with time of 46.781 seconds. He was joined on the front row of the grid by Stewart. Newman qualified third, Kasey Kahne took fourth, and Biffle started fifth. Gordon, Bill Elliott, Casey Mears, Allmendinger and Keselowski rounded out the top ten. The driver that failed to qualify for the race was Robert Richardson Jr. Once the qualifying session had concluded, Kenseth stated, "The interesting thing about qualifying, at least for me today, was nobody had any idea what the pole was going to be or how fast anybody was. They lined qualifying up by first practice speeds, but that was drafting for everybody. So, you really didn't know what anybody was going to run. That's the same lap we ran during a mock-up qualifying run [Friday], so I was glad we were able to repeat that, but I didn't know what anybody else was going to run. It's kind of fun to watch, because you really have no idea."

Prior to the race
Tony Stewart was stripped of his second place starting spot after his car failed post-qualifying inspection. A. J. Allmendinger was suspended by NASCAR after failing a drug test. Penske Racing scrambled to get Sam Hornish Jr. in the #22 and had Kenny Wallace (who himself was on standby for expectant father Kevin Harvick after NASCAR would not approve Austin Dillon for Sprint Cup competition at Daytona) ready to step in if Hornish couldn't make it to Daytona on time. Michael McDowell got into the #98 Phil Parsons Racing entry that Mike Bliss qualified.

Results

Qualifying

Notes
 — Tony Stewart will have to start forty-second after his time and speed was disallowed because of an air hose violation found in post-qualifying inspection. Stewart was later docked six points for the infraction.
 — Sam Hornish Jr. replaced Allmendinger after he failed a drug test.
 — Michael McDowell raced in the car.
 — Marcos Ambrose started in the rear due to an unapproved change to the car under impound race rules.

Race results

Standings after the race

Drivers' Championship standings

Manufacturers' Championship standings

Note: Only the top five positions are included for the driver standings.

References

NASCAR races at Daytona International Speedway
Coke Zero 400
Coke Zero 400
Coke Zero 400